Wonderama is an album by Randy Stonehill released in 1991 on Myrrh Records.

Track listing
All songs written by Randy Stonehill except as otherwise noted.
 "Wonderama" (Stonehill, Terry Taylor) – 6:20
 "I Will Follow" (Stonehill, Taylor) – 3:00
 "Barbie Nation" (Stonehill, Taylor) – 4:57
 "Don't Be Sad" (Randy Stonehill, Angelo Natalie) – 4:15
 "Rachel Delevoryas"  – 3:19
 "Intermission at the Wonderama"  – 1:05
 "Great Big Stupid World" (Stonehill, Taylor) – 5:47
 "Sing in Portuguese"  – 4:05
 "Mice & Men"  – 3:13
 "The Lost Parade"  – 4:14
 "Lantern in the Snow" (Stonehill, Taylor) – 4:36
 "Wonderama Postlude" (Stonehill, Taylor) – :42

Personnel 
The Wonderama Band
 Randy Stonehill – lead vocals (1-5, 7-11), backing vocals (1-4, 7, 9, 11), lead guitar (1), acoustic guitar (1, 2, 5, 7-11), guitars (3, 4, 12)
 Rob Watson – keyboards (1, 4, 9, 11), calliope (1, 9, 12), music box (1), bells (1, 8), marimba (2, 8), ballroom piano (3), backing vocals (3), string arrangements and conductor (5, 6), acoustic piano (7, 9), organ (7), horn arrangements and conductor (10), celesta (11)
 Rick Elias – second acoustic guitar (1, 7, 9, 11), second guitars (2), backing vocals (2), lead guitar (3), acoustic guitar (4), electric guitar (4), Nashville tenor guitar (4), lead acoustic guitar (8), lead electric guitar (10), guitars (12)
 Tim Chandler – bass (1, 3, 4, 7-12)
 David Raven – drums (1-4, 7-12)

Additional musicians
 Jerry Waller – accordion (1, 8, 12)
 Greg Flesch – lead guitar (7), EBow (7)
 Omar Domkus – stand-up bass (2)
 Burleigh Drummond – sleigh bells (1), glockenspiel (1, 11), cymbal swells (1, 11), chimes (1), kettle drums (1, 2, 11), shaker (1, 11), claves (2), congas (2), dream cymbals (4), percussion (7, 8, 10), Burleigh's Madhouse (7), tambourine (9), second snare (9), cowbell (9), bodhrán (10), snow bells (11)
 Robert Martin – cello (1, 5, 6)
 Dianne Ready – viola (5, 6)
 Michelle Richards – violin (2)
 Beth Falsom – violin (5, 6)
 Terry Glenn – violin (5, 6)
 Doug Webb – clay pipes (8, 11), ocarina (8), bass recorder (8), tenor ocarina (11)
 The Salvation Army Horns, Los Angeles Chapter – horns (10)
 Terry Scott Taylor – backing vocals (1, 11)
 Janet McTaggart – Muse of hope (1, 10)
 Linda Elias – backing vocals (2)
 Riki Michele – backing vocals (2, 3, 4, 11)
 Jerry Chamberlain – backing vocals (3, 4, 7, 9), lead guitar (9)
 Sharon McCall – backing vocals (4, 7)

Los Campesinos Mariachi Band – backing vocals on "Sing in Portuguese"
 Steve Luevano
 Steve Luevano Jr.
 Hilario Gonzalez
 Antonio Gonzalez 

Boy's Choir on "Lantern in the Snow"
 Nolan McSparren 
 Preston Geeting 
 Abraham Handler

Production 
 Mark Maxwell – executive producer
 Ray Ware – executive producer
 Terry Scott Taylor – producer 
 Gene Eugene – recording
 Steve Hall – mastering at Future Disc (Hollywood, California)
 Mixing Lab A, Garden Grove, California – recording location for basic track, percussion, backing vocals, keyboard
 Neverland Studios, Cerritos, California – recording location for lead vocals, guitar, string, keyboard, woodwind, accordion
 Mixing Lab B – recording location for background vocals, guitars, keyboards, percussion)
 MicroNote – recording location for  horns, background vocals, strings
 McCrummy Music – recording location for background vocals
 Jerry and Sharon's Wax Lips Studio – pre–production demo recording location
 Mixing Lab A – mixing location
 Roz – art director
 Court Patton – artwork and design
 Tom Gulotta – artwork and design
 Patton Bros. Design, El Cajon, California – artwork and design
 Nick Nacca – photography
 Linda Krikorian– photography

References

1991 albums
Randy Stonehill albums